Jimmy Zambrano (born November 2, 1967 in Guamal, Magdalena), is a Colombian accordion player.

Born in Colombia, he left at an early age for Caracas, Venezuela, where he studied music and specialized in piano. There, he was called by Los Melódicos of Renato Capriles to record a vallenato song by Poncho Zuleta titled "Luzmila," which became the first song and recording by this artist. In 1993, he recorded an album called "Vallenato y más" with the group  "Los Clásicos," alongside Aníbal Caicedo and Jair Castañeda. In 1995, Omar Geles discovered his talent in a tour in Venezuela and invited him to belong to Los Diablitos as keyboard player, with whom he performed until 1999. During his time with Los Diablitos, he produced and arranged various music genres and formed a vallenato ensemble known as "Los Emigrantes," with Aníbal Caidedo.

In 1999, he started playing with Jorge Celedón, who had just left the Binomio de Oro de América. Together, they recorded 9 albums, earning international acclaim. With Celedón, he won a Latin Grammy in 2007 in the Cumbia Vallenato category. In 2012, the duo broke up as the result of disagreements. In 2013, Zambrano met Dubán Bayona, another ex-Binomio de Oro performer, with whom he released a first album called Métete en el viaje, which has received favorable reviews.

Discography

Aníbal Caicedo (Los Emigrantes) 

 Un Nuevo Sendero - FM Discos y Cintas - 1997
 Que Hable El Alma - FM Discos y Cintas - 1998

Jorge Celedón 

 Romántico como yo - Sony Music - 2000
 Llévame en tus sueños - Sony Music - 2001
 Canto vallenato - Sony Music - 2002
 ¡Juepa je! - Sony Music - 2004
 Grande éxitos en vivo - Sony Music - 2005
 Son... Para el mundo - Sony Music - 2006
 De lo nuevo de lo mejor - Sony Music - 2008
 La invitación - Sony Music - 2009
 Lo que tú necesitas - Sony Music - 2011
 Celedón sin fronteras Vol 1 (Shared album with Gustavo García) - Sony Music - 2013
 Celedón sin fronteras Vol 2 (Shared album with Gustavo García) - Sony Music - 2014

Dubán Bayona 
 Métete en el viaje - Sony Music - 2013

Other artists - singles 

 "Dismelódicos (Los Melódicos)" (Song "Luzmila") - 1984
 "Toby Love Reloaded" (Toby Love ft Jorge Celedón) (Song "Amores como el tuyo") - 2007
 "Viento a favor" (Alejandro Fernández) (Song "Eres") - Sony Music - 2008
 "Amaia Montero 2" (Amaia Montero) (Song "Caminando") - Sony Music - 2011
 "A contratiempo" (Juan Fernando Velasco ft Jorge Celedón) (Song "Yo nací aquí") - 2012
 Primera fila día 2 (Cristian Castro ft Jorge Celedon) (Song "Lloran las rosas") - 2014

References

External links 
 
 
 

1967 births
Colombian accordionists
Vallenato musicians
Living people
Sony Music Colombia artists
Musicians from Caracas
21st-century accordionists